Pilot Point Independent School District is a public school district based in Pilot Point, Texas (USA). Located in Denton County, portions of the district extend into Cooke and Grayson counties.

In 2009, the school district was rated "academically acceptable" by the Texas Education Agency. In 2016, the Middle school and High school each received a TEA gold star distinction for postsecondary academic readiness.

Schools
Pilot Point High School (Grades 9-12)
Pilot Point Middle School (Grades 6-8)
Pilot Point Elementary  School (Grades 1-5)
Pilot Point Early Childhood Center (Grades PK-K)

Athletic Achievements
Class 2A State Football Champions - 1980 (Co-Champs), 1981 & 2009 (Division I)
Class 2A State Softball Champions - 2013

References 

https://www.pilotpointisd.com/m/pages/index.jsp?type=d&uREC_ID=495812&pREC_ID=949029

External links
Pilot Point ISD

School districts in Denton County, Texas
School districts in Cooke County, Texas
School districts in Grayson County, Texas